The Pingelapese language is a Micronesian language native to Pingelap, an atoll belonging to the state of Pohnpei in the Federated States of Micronesia. This atoll is the homeland to the Pingelapese people, consisting of a three-square mile range of uninhabited small coral islets, Daekae and Sukora, and the inhabited islet, Pingelap. These islands partially make up the Caroline Islands.

Because of natural disasters and emigration consequent to European and U.S. influence, the local population of the Pingelapese people is small. There are at least 2,000 Pingelapese people worldwide. 

Although the official language of the Pohnpei State is English, 200 of the 250 Pingelap atoll residents and 1,200 Pohnpei residents speak Pingelapese. The Pingelapese language is used for face-to-face communication among speakers of all ages. It is classified as a vigorous language. With the help of linguists like Leilani Welley-Biza sharing knowledge from her elders, significant cultural/historical connections to the Pingelapese language have been more thoroughly documented and preserved, to be passed down between generations. The Doahkaesa and King of Pingelap, His Majesty Dr. Berysin D. Salomon, and His Majesty's chosen traditional leaders, through the Pingelapese customary rite, strive to maintain the traditional language and the cultural/historical heritage of the people of Pingelap.

Family and origin 

Pingelapese is a Micronesian member of the Austronesian language family. It is closely related to other languages within the Chuukic-Pohnpeic branch, sharing 83% lexical similarity with Mokilese and sharing 79% lexical similarity with Pohnpeian. Approximately 5,000 years ago, the Austronesian peoples voyaged eastward from Taiwan, and eventually made it to Micronesia about 3,000 years later. Morton et al. estimated that the Micronesian peoples have resided on Pingelap for 1,000 years, nearly 800 years before any European contact were to be recorded.

Popular Pohnpeian legends passed down in oral history have created an endless controversy over the origins of the Pingelapese people, or any outer island of Pohnpei for that matter, suggesting possible origins from the people of Kosrae in the Legend of Nahwehlap, or a differing ancestry claimed to be linked to the people of Yap in the Legend of Yap. The Legend of Yap states the discovery of the island of Pikelap, now known worldwide as the island of Pingelap, by two Yapese brothers who sailed from Yap in search of a new life beyond the shores of Yap as opposed to many island folklores of mystical island creation by mythological creatures or a demi-god being who, after being delivered out of his mother's womb, stood up strong and ran, skipped infancy and childhood, and instantly became a man. Other versions of oral history taken in account by locals who have no traditional historical background as opposed to those with traditional historical background make it difficult to decipher approximately when the one known Kosraean term found in the Pingelapese language, which is Doahkaesa, was introduced to the Pingelapese vocabulary. According to the Pingelapese traditional oral history, ‘Aewa is the Pikelapese term for King while Doahkaesa is the Kosraean term for King.

In the Pingelapese traditional oral history, formerly held by the Nahno of Pingelap - a traditional title given by the first Ouwa whose one purpose is to keep the Pingelapese oral history and pass on the traditional oral history to the Ouwa and his descendants as decreed by Pingelapese traditional law, it describes the origins of Pingelap lineage to the people of Yap and the discovery of Pikelap by these two Yapese siblings. The older brother was said to have returned to Kosrae to marry a Kosraean woman whom he had met and fell in love with before their voyage and discovery of the island of Pikelap. It also describes a time when descendants of Kosrae became local residents of Pingelap which ultimately linked their influence and reign over the people of Pingelap which resulted in the integration of language similarities between the two islands. It describes a history between Pingelap and Pohnpei through the conquest of Nan Madol and the integration and language similarities between the two islands. It also describes that while voyaging to Pohnpei for the conquest of Nan Madol, the prominent legendary warrior known as Isoah Kaelaekael, or known by Pohnpeians as Isokelekel, met with their rivaling neighbors, the people of Mwoakilloa, to recruit warriors to fight in the conquest of Nan Madol resulting in the recruitment of one such Mwokillese warrior named "Nahparadak" which is now a Pohnpeian traditional title called "Nahnparadak" given only to a Mwokillese man greatly respected by Pohnpeiani in Madolenihmw's traditional ranks. Historically, Pingelapese named their children based on a special feature or foreseen ability or destiny upon birth. For example, Doahkaesa Iengiringir was named Iengiringir for having large feet that made the grounds tremble whenever he walked. Iengiringir is loosely translated in the English language as "rumble or tremble" relating to the low rumble of the ocean waves crashing in the horizon.

Although many Pohnpeian and Kosraean islanders may disagree with the Pingelap traditional oral history, one way of finding one's origins where there is very little to no evidence that may support any theory of origin is to look into the language of the group(s) of people in question. Many people believe that the current Pohnpeian language is the main language of the main island and its outer atolls. To what extent is arguably unknown because many still argue today despite the many attempts conducted by foreign researchers who were researching the origin of language in the less-likely of areas and with people who had no rich historical, cultural, and traditional background and the language of the islands in question to begin with. For example, the Pohnpeian word maing is taken from the German word mein during the German occupation of Pohnpei. Loosely translated, Maing in the English dictionary is Sir/Madam. Pohnpeians integrated the German word mein into their language and used it, specifically, for a person of high traditional or political rank or of great respect. During this era, the Germans took the traditional Pohnpeian rite of having one paramount chief or king of the island and divided the island into 5 municipalities and erected 5 rulers to each border area, which is similar to the Kingdom of Belgium's Markies/Marquis in Belgium, Germany. Pohnpeian's integrated the German word and made it their own and today calls each village chief Nahnmwarki. During the Japanese era, the Japanese introduced electricity to the island and called it using the Japanese word denki. The Japanese tried to teach the locals of what electricity is while using the Japanese language, and the locals mistook the meaning of the Japanese word denki as light bulb. As a result, the Pohnpeian word for "light bulb" is "denki". Before the era of the 5 Nahnmwarkis of the main island of Pohnpei, there was only one Paramount King of the newly conquered Pohnpei, and before that the Saudeleur Dynasty.

Pohnpeians are well known for using a name of a place to identify a food or object completely foreign to the island, or an area referring to the person's native land before settling themselves in Pohnpei. For the example of a foreign object: a very large and thick steel pot is called kwatilain in Pohnpeian. According to Pohnpeian oral history, these larger-than-normal pots were introduced to Pohnpeian from a military personnel who came from the military post in Kwajalein during the US occupation of Micronesia after the 2nd World War and since then has been incorporated into the Pohnpeian language to describe the largest steel pot found in almost many Pohnpeian family kitchen or local cook houses. For the example of a foreign food: Pohnpeian named many fruits and other foods from where they came from - Uht en Ruhk, Karer en Kusai, Sakau en Kusai, Uht en Pihsih, Mei en Sahmwoa, Uht en Iap, Mengat en Seipahn, oh Uht en Menihle is loosely translated in English to Banana from Chuuk, Lime from Kosrae, Sakau (Kava) from Kosrae, Banana from Fiji, Breadfruit from Samoa, Banana from Yap, Banana from Saipan, and Banana from Manila. For the example of renaming an area for which the settler originally came from: In Pohnpei, there is only one community within a municipality that is also, surprisingly, called Saekaraekapw. Saekaraekapw is one of four villages in Pingelap. In the Pingelapese oral traditional history, Saelaepas, who is a prominent legendary warrior in the conquest of Nan Madol, is a native of Saekaraekapw. This community is found in Madolenihmw, the once presumed-capital of the once ruthless ruler of Pohnpei living in Nan Madol, Saudeleur. Today, this community's traditional leader is given the Pohnpeian traditional title called "Selepat."

History 

Since the introduction of democracy into the Micronesian regions, the Pingelapese people were grouped together with the remaining outer islands of Pohnpei to create the political State of Pohnpei. Other cultural influences are evident in Pingelapese history. The Spanish era is portrayed in the Pingelapese dance called "Din Dihn" which is loosely translated in English to "Tin Tin". The dance reflects the introduction of the durable foreign material called tin by the Spaniards. After the Spaniards were the Japanese, and the bilateral relationship created between both groups is still evident at World War II sites in the southern part of Pingelap.

Foreign influence has altered the stability of the Pingelapese community, encouraging natives to leave their homeland and move to other more populated areas or to the U.S. (incentivizing emigration under contract in the Federated States of Micronesia to work and study elsewhere, or enlist in the United States military for a better living standard). More promising financial opportunities for the Pingelapese people, meant prioritizing the education of foreign languages over their native language.

Typhoons have frequently devastated the Pingelapese population. As a consequence of the Pingelapese population decreasing to a handful of typhoon survivors, inbreeding occurred among multiple Pingelapese generations, and genetic disorders such as achromatopsia (color blindness) now affect almost 1 in every 20 Pingelapese descendant.

With the introduction of Christianity and the Church, the Pingelapese community has accepted the role of the church, which has a strong presence and has become an integral part of the Pingelapese lifestyle since being established in the 19th century. Christmas is considered the biggest annual event.

Historical sound changes

1 In the Pohnpeic languages, geminate obstruents are realized as homorganic nasal-obstruent clusters.

2 Often before .
3 Before .
4 The reflex is *∅ sporadically before PMc *e.

Calendar system 
The Pingelapese language has a calendar system corresponding to the lunar calendar. There are 12 months associated with this calendar

 Kahlaek (March)
 Soaunpwonginwehla (April)
 Paelaekwar (May)
 Soledahn (June)
 Sokosok (July)
 Idihd (August)
 Maesaenaeir (September)
 Kaepihsukoru (October)
 Pihkaer (November)
 Ihkaehwa (December)
 Aepwaelap (January)
 Memwahleu (February)

Date system 
Each date of the month has a specific name:

 E Sukoru (1st) - also known as the new moon
 E Ling (2nd)
 E Sehm (3rd)
 Masepeng (4th)
 Masalim (5th)
 Mesawon (6th)
 Meseis (7th)
 Mesawel (8th)
 Woalduadu (9th)
 Medel (10th)
 Siepwong (11th)
 Arkohnge (12th)
 Sekainpe (13th)
 Woalopwo (14th)
 Woalemwahu (15th)
 Mas (16th) - also known as the full moon
 Er (17th)
 Lelidi (18th)
 Koahmwaloa (19th)
 Edemen Koahmwaloa (20th)
 Apeleng (21st)
 Sengek (22nd)
 Wesengek (23rd)
 Dapas (24th)
 Dapasmeing (25th)
 Kerdakehleng (26th)
 Areiso (27th)
 Semwenpal (28th)
 Ihla (29th)
 Esep (30th)
 Epei (31st)

In the Pingelapese culture, Monday marks the first day of the week. The names for the days of the week come from the Pingelapese non specific object numeral set. This number follows the prefix "niy-" to become the word designated for the day of the week. For example, the Pingelapese word for Monday is "niyaehd". The words for the other days of the months are as follows: niyari (Tuesday), niyesil (Wednesday), niyaepang (Thursday), and niyalim (Friday).

Numerals 
The Pingelapese language incorporates at least five sets of numeral classifiers. These classifiers combine numbers and nouns. The nouns must have some sort of relation to the object for example, how it is shaped or how it is used. Each of these set designates a different set of words to represent the numeral one through nine.

There is a set of words designated for describing long nouns, such as trees or roads. These numerals are:

 aepas
 risepas
 silipas
 pahpas
 luhpas
 woanaepas
 isipas
 waelaepas
 duaepas

There is another set of words used to count animate things, such as: men, fish or birds. This words are as follows:

 aemen
 riaemaen
 silimaen
 pahmaen
 luhmaen
 woanaemaen
 isimaen
 waelaemaen
 duaemaen

A third set is designated for small or partial objects and these are as follows:

 ekis
 risekis
 silikis
 pahkis
 lumikis
 woanikis
 isikis
 waelikis
 duoau

For all other nouns (couples, stream, land), there is another set of words to represent the numbers one through nine.

 eu
 riau
 silu
 pahu
 limau
 wonou
 isu
 waelu
 duoau

There is one final set of number names. This set is used to count things that are not specific. This list includes:

 aehd
 ari
 esil
 aepoang
 alim
 awoahn
 aeis
 aewael
 add
 eisik

For numbers greater that nine, there is only one word for each numeral. they no longer vary depending on what they are being used to count. The Pingepalese words for numbers greater than 9 are as follows:

 10 - eisaek
 20 - rieisaek
 30 - silihsaek
 40 - pahisaek
 50 - limeisaek
 60 - woneisaek
 70 - isihsaek
 80 - waelihsaek
 90 - tueisaek
 100 - epwiki
 200 - repwiki
 300 - silipwiki
 400 - pahpwiki
 500 - limepwiki
 600 - wonepwiki
 700 - isipwiki
 800 - waelipwiki
 900 - duepwiki
 1,000 - kid
 10,000 - naen
 100,000 - lop
 1,000,000 - rar
 10,000,000 - dep
 100,000,000 - sap
 1,000,000,000 - lik

When reading a number in Pingelapse, start with the biggest number first and read the smaller numbers in succession. An example of this would be as follows: the number 1,769 would be spoken as "kid isipwiki woneisaek duoau".

Sentence structure 

The Pingelapese language has four major types of sentences. These four are transitive sentences, intransitive sentences, existential sentences, and equational sentences.

Transitive sentences

The first type of sentence, transitive, use transitive verbs. Transitive verbs have two main characteristics. The first characteristic is that it must be an action verb expressing an activity that can physically be done. For example, drink, sit, or drive. The second characteristic is that there must be a direct object, meaning someone or something has to be the recipient of the action verb. For example, Susan drank the water. Two participants must be involved to have a transitive sentence. There is also a fixed word order: subject-transitive verb-object. For example, Susan (subject) filled (transitive verb) the cup (object). If the verb is active in a transitive sentence, the subject's semantic role is the agent. The object's semantic role would be the patient. (Payne 2006:105-107) 

Intransitive sentences

The second sentence structure used in Pingelapese would be intransitive verb sentences. An intransitive verb has no object attached to it. For example, Richard winked. In Pingelapese must be a stative verb or an active verb. A stative verb is when the person or object is affected by said verb. An active verb occurs if the action is performed by the subject. There is a specific word order for intransitive sentences too. This word is order Subject-Verb. Referring back to the previous example, Richard (subject) winked (verb).  There are also cases when the word order used is Verb-Subject for intransitive sentence structure, however not all intransitive verbs can use the Verb-Subject word order. Verb-Subject word order is only available in Pingelapese when referencing unaccusative verbs or by discourse pragmatics. Intransitive sentences also known as "existential" have a postverbal subject the majority of the time. Intransitive verbs only have one solid grammatical relation which is the subject of the sentence. When the verb is active the entity is doing the action.

Existential sentences

Existential sentences are the third type of sentence structure used. Normally existential sentences that have a post-verbal subject are used in the beginning of a story to introduce new characters or objects that have not been referenced before. These verbs are not used when the character is already known. If a character is already known, the verb would be used in the preverbal position This form has a dominant post-verbal subject order. Post-verbal subjects allow new characters to be introduced or new and unknown events to happen. Existential sentences make a claim that something either exists or it does not. There are not many verbs of existential origin in Pingelapese. These include “minae” (to exist), “soh” (to not exist), “dir” (to exist in large numbers), and “daeri” (to be finished). All four of these verbs use a postverbal subject.  These words are generally used when introducing characters of a story. . 

Verbal equational sentences

In most Micronesian languages, a verb may not be required. Some sentences, called equational sentences, use one noun phrase to identify or locate another noun phrase, without the need of a verbal element. One of the nouns is used to indicate location and the other noun is used for identification. There is also an auxiliary verb located in between the two nouns. Pingelapese has a similar sentence type, although instead of a verbless construction it employs a verbal construction. e/ae are used in Pingelapese as auxiliary verbs, which are verbs that are used to supplement other verbs. These auxiliary verbs can be used independently to equate two noun phrases. They can also be used to indicate a question. e is used when the speaker is certain of his statement and ae is used when the speaker is uncertain of his statement. Example sentences are shown below.

Calvin daekah Brenda e soaun-padahk-pwi

‘Calvin and Brenda are teachers.”

Calvin daekah Brenda ae soaun-padahk-pwi

‘Calvin and Brenda are teachers?”

Direct questions 

Direct questions are mostly asked with a question word, but when a question word is excluded from the sentence, a question is distinguished by a non-falling final intonation (remains steady or slightly spiked intonation). The question words are as follows: "ish" means "who", "dah" means "what", "ngahd" means "when".

Morphology 
Similar to other languages, words in Pingelapese can take different forms to add to or even change their meanings. Verbal suffixes are morphemes added at the end of a word to change its form. Pingelapese uses many verbal suffixes, but few verbal prefixes. Prefixes are those that are added at the front. For example, the Pingelapese suffix –kin means ‘with’ or ‘at.’ It is added at the end of a verb.

ius = to use --> ius-kin = to use with

mwahu = to be good --> mwahu-kin = to be good at

sa- is an example of a verbal prefix. It is added to the beginning of a word and means ‘not.’ The following sentence is an example of how -sa is used.

pwung = to be correct --> sa-pwung = to be incorrect

There are also directional suffixes that when added to the root word give the listener a better idea of where the subject is headed. The verb alu means to walk. A directional suffix can be used to give more detail.

-da = ‘up’ --> aluh-da = to walk up

-di = ‘down’ --> aluh-di = to walk down

-eng = ‘away from speaker and listener’ --> aluh-eng = to walk away

Pingelapese also uses reduplication. This can be either partial or total reduplication when speaking with durative meaning. Triplification is also used. Generally a part of a verb or a whole verb is repeated to communicate continuative meaning. The only other languages that use triplification are Tibetan, Chintang, Batwana, and Thao.

Directional suffixes are not limited to motion verbs. When added to non-motion verbs, their meanings are a figurative one. The following table gives some examples of directional suffixes and their possible meanings.

Preverbal prefix list:

Reduplication and triplication 

The Pingelapese language uses reduplication and triplication. Reduplication is used to show that a verb is being acted continuously. An example of this would be "wou", which means "to bark", and "wouwou", which means "barking". Triplication shows that the action is "still" happening. Using the same example, "wou-wou-wou" would mean "still barking".

Oftentimes reduplication and triplication produce consonant clusters. There are two ways that the language handles these consonant clusters. The first being, if the consonants are homorganic, the first would be left out and the next vowel is lengthened. An example of this would be the verb "to swim". In Pingepalese, the word for the verb "to swim" would be "pap", but the word for continuously swimming would be "pahpap", while "still swimming" would be "pahpahpap". If the consonants are not homorganic with each other, a vowel is inserted in between the two consonants to break them up. For example, the verb meaning "to dance" is "wen". The continuous action of "dancing" would be conveyed as "wenewen", while "still dancing would be "wenewenewen".

The most common form of reduplication comes in the same phoneme count as the aforementioned examples, three. The second most common occurrence of reduplication and triplication are in the replication of the first four phonemes. A few four phoneme reduplication examples are as follows: "kusupaek" (the coming of surf over reef in low tide) would be reduplicated as "kusukusupaek" and "kerir" (to love in secret) would be reduplicated as "kerikerir".

Orthography 
Many native speakers of Pingelapese have little practice reading and writing in their language. On the atoll and in other areas, Pingelapese speakers speak Pingelapese at home and at church. English and Pohnpeian are the main languages of education and administrative communication. Because of this, Pingelapese people have proficiency reading and writing in English and Pohnpeian, but few people are able to read or write Pingelapese, leaving it to be a predominantly spoken language.

There is a significant literacy challenge when it comes to learning Pingelapese. There are few study materials available to elementary school student to teach them Pingelapese, and therefore it is common for students to learn only English and Pohnpeian. Children often have a difficult time learning how to read and write both Pingelapese and Pohnpeian, often incorrectly correlating sounds and letters.

The difficulty of learning how to read and write in Pingelapese may also be due to an inadequate alphabet suited to the language. This along with the lack of training in the language makes many people reluctant to write in Pingelapese.

Unlike many other Micronesian languages, the Pingelapese people were never able to form a proper orthography committee board. The purpose of this board is to develop an official and agreed upon writing system. This has left the Pingelapese language with different spellings of its documents and records. For example, the name has been spelt as both Pingilap and Pingelap.

It has been reported that around fifty years ago there was an early orthography taught at the Pingelap elementary atoll. It is not known to many people, but elderly Pingelapese people have confirmed it. It is not actively used or taught in schools despite efforts to revive it. The loss of this orthography could have been due to emigration out of the Pingelap and into Pohnpei, increasing the use of the Pohnpeian alphabet. Most people who speak Pingelapese use Pohnpeic orthography for administrative and educational purposes and early orthography for history and legends of Pingelap. There are great differences between early orthography and Pohneic orthography when it comes to phonemic distinction. Some of these differences can alter the meaning of some words in Pingelapese. Some other differences are the number of vowels. Pingelapese has eight and Pohnpeian orthography has only six. This means that the distinction of some of the vowels in Pingelapese are underrepresented in Pohnpeic. These changes cause drastic ambiguity that context cannot fix, such as tense change.

Phonology 
The degree of language used differs between communities. All of the Pingelap communities have experienced language shift.

The Pingelapese language consists of a total of thirty-five phonemes. There are 11 consonants and 14 vowels. 

Pingelapese has ten syllables and eight vowel phonemes. This is the first recorded Pohnpeic language that has an eight-vowel system. Multiple young and elderly Pingelapese speakers in the Mwalok and Pingelap atoll can confirm this recent discovery of the eighth vowel. This is also the first Pohnpeic system that has a more symmetrical vowel system with [-round] [-back] vowels in four heights and [+round] [+back] vowels in four heights.

One of the consistent rules throughout Micronesia is vowel-shortening.

Low vowel dissimilation is a phonological process in which there are two low vowels in successive syllables, the first of which is raised. It is seen in various Micronesian languages as well as Ere, Southern Paamese, and in the Southern Vanuatu subgroup. Pingelapese is the first Pohnpeic language that demonstrates this process. 

Stand alone auxiliary verbs are also a constant in Pingelapese. These verbs are created by taking the ae, aen, e, and e from the pronoun auxiliary complex and will leave the person/number morphemes out.

1 In the Pohnpeic languages, geminate obstruents are realized as homorganic nasal-obstruent clusters.
2 Often before .
3 Before .
4 The reflex is *∅ sporadically before PMc *e.

Pronouns 
Subject pronouns are personal pronouns that are used as the subject of a verb. In Pingelapese, subject pronouns originated from either proto-Micronesian subject agreement set or an independent pronoun set. Unlike English, Pingelapese subject pronouns can come in singular, dual, and plural forms, indicating the number of listeners the speaker is addressing. The following table gives some examples of subject pronouns in their singular, dual, and plural forms.

Pingelapese also has auxiliary verbs and pronouns together. This is a concept known as pronoun-auxiliary complex. This is a concept strictly known in Pingelapese and no other Micronesian languages.

References

Endangered Austronesian languages
Languages of the Federated States of Micronesia
Pohnpeic languages
Pohnpei
Severely endangered languages